Jan Fedder (14 January 1955 – 30 December 2019) was a German actor, born in Hamburg. He was best known for his role as police officer Dirk Matthies in the German television show Großstadtrevier. He was also known for his role as the crude Petty Officer Pilgrim in Wolfgang Petersen's film, Das Boot. Fedder was especially known for playing typical Northern German characters.

Fedder was diagnosed with oral cancer in 2012. He died on 30 December 2019 in Hamburg of the disease, aged 64. He had been in a wheelchair for the past few months of his life.

Filmography

References

External links

1955 births
2019 deaths
Male actors from Hamburg
German male television actors
German male film actors
20th-century German male actors
21st-century German male actors
Deaths from cancer in Germany